Sheldon Township may refer to the following townships in the United States:

 Sheldon Township, Iroquois County, Illinois
 Sheldon Township, Houston County, Minnesota

See also 
 Port Sheldon Township, Michigan